
Gmina Radziejów is a rural gmina (administrative district) in Radziejów County, Kuyavian-Pomeranian Voivodeship, in north-central Poland. Its seat is the town of Radziejów, although the town is not part of the territory of the gmina.

Villages
Gmina Radziejów contains the villages and settlements of Bieganowo, Biskupice, Broniewek, Broniewo, Czołówek, Czołowo, Kłonówek, Kwilno, Łany Wybranieckie, Leonowo, Opatowice, Piołunowo, Plebanka, Płowce, Pruchnowo, Przemystka, Rokitki, Skibin, Stare Płowki, Stary Radziejów, Stary Radziejów-Kolonia, Szostka Duża, Szybka, Tarnówka and Zagorzyce.

Neighbouring gminas
Gmina Radziejów is bordered by the town of Radziejów and by the gminas of Bytoń, Dobre, Kruszwica, Osięciny and Piotrków Kujawski.

References
Polish official population figures 2006

Radziejow
Radziejów County